École-Valentin is a  railway station located in École-Valentin, Doubs, eastern France. The station was opened in 2013 and is located on the Besançon-Viotte-Vesoul railway connecting railway, linking Besançon with Besançon Franche-Comté TGV. The train services are operated by SNCF.

References

External links
The station on ter-sncf.com (in French)

Railway stations in France opened in 2013
Railway stations in Doubs